The following are lists of countries by suicide rate as published by the World Health Organization (WHO) and other sources.

About one person in 5,000–15,000 dies by suicide every year, with an estimated global rate of 10.5 per 100,000 population down from 11.6 in 2008. In high-income modernized countries male and female rates of suicidal behaviors differ much compared to those in the rest of the world: while women are reportedly more prone to suicidal thoughts, rates of suicide are higher among men, which has been described as a "silent epidemic".

A study in 2019 found that between 1990 and 2016 global age-standardized suicide rates fell by a third; the rates in 2016 were about 16 deaths per 100,000 men and 7 deaths per 100,000 women. Women experienced a greater decrease compared with men over the study period.

As such, suicide rates may be higher than measured, with men more at risk of dying by suicide than women across nearly all cultures and backgrounds. Suicide prevention and intervention is an important topic for all peoples, according to the WHO.

Data

Latest 

* indicates "Suicide in COUNTRY or TERRITORY" or "Mental Health in COUNTRY or TERRITORY" links.

Historical

Male 

* indicates "Suicide in COUNTRY or TERRITORY" or "Mental Health in COUNTRY or TERRITORY" links.

Female 

* indicates "Suicide in COUNTRY or TERRITORY" or "Mental Health in COUNTRY or TERRITORY" links.

All 

* indicates "Suicide in COUNTRY or TERRITORY" or "Mental Health in COUNTRY or TERRITORY" links.

Analysis

Male and female suicide rates are out of total male population and total female population, respectively (i.e. total number of male suicides divided by total male population). Age-standardized rates account for the influence that different population age distributions might have on the analysis of crude death rates, statistically addressing the prevailing trends by age-groups and populations' structures, to enhance long term cross-national comparability: based on age-groups' deviation from standardized population structures, rates are rounded up or down (age-adjustment). Basically, the presence of younger individuals in any given age structure carries more weight: if the rate is rounded up that means the median age is lower than average for that region (or country), and vice versa when rounded down.

Most countries listed above report a higher male suicide rate, as worldwide there are about 3 male suicides out of 4, or a factor of 3:1 (for example, in the United States was 3.36 in 2015, and 3.53 in 2016).

Though age-standardization is common statistical process to categorize mortality data for comparing purposes this approach by WHO is based on estimates which take into account issues such as under-reporting, resulting in rates differing from the official national statistics prepared and endorsed by individual countries (and revisions are also performed periodically). Also, age-adjusted rates are mortality rates that would have existed if all populations under study had the same age distribution as a "standard" population. Plain, crude estimated rates are available at here and here. Countries with a population less than 100 000 are excluded.

List by other sources and years (1985–2019)

In this list various sources from various years are included, mixing plain crude rates with age-adjusted rates and estimated rates, so cross-national comparability is somewhat skewed.

* indicates "Suicide in COUNTRY or TERRITORY" or "Mental Health in COUNTRY or TERRITORY" links.

See also 
 Epidemiology of suicide
 Gender differences in suicide
 Suicide in the military
 List of countries by intentional death rate
 List of countries by intentional homicide rate
 List of countries by life expectancy
List of suicide crisis lines

Explanatory notes 

 The updated figure of suicide rates in Belgium for 2011 is 2,084 with a total population of 10,933,607, equivalent to 18.96 per 100,000 inhabitants (source: Het Nieuwsblad, 10 April 2014).
 Taiwan is not a member of the WHO. The Taiwanese government adopted the WHO standard in 2007. According to the Taiwanese government's self-released data, the figure is standardized based upon the population within Taiwan.

References

External links
 Suicide data and rates published by the World Health Organization (WHO).

Lists of countries
Lists of countries by per capita values

Suicide-related lists